Abdul Rahman bin Mohamad (Jawi: عبدالرحمن بن محمد; is a Malaysian politician who has served as the Deputy Minister of Works in the Pakatan Harapan (PH) administration under Prime Minister Anwar Ibrahim and Minister Alexander Nanta Linggi since December 2022 and the Member of Parliament (MP) for Lipis since May 2013. Abdul Rahman served as the Deputy Minister of Rural Development I in the Barisan Nasional (BN) administration under former Prime Minister Ismail Sabri Yaakob and former Minister Mahdzir Khalid from August 2021 to the collapse of the BN administration in November 2022 and  his first term in the Perikatan Nasional (PN) administration under former Prime Minister Muhyiddin Yassin and former Minister Abdul Latiff Ahmad from March 2020 to the collapse of the PN administration in August 2021. He also served as Member of the Pahang State Legislative Assembly (MLA) for Padang Tengku from March 2004 to May 2013. He is a member of the United Malays National Organisation (UMNO), a component party of the BN coalition.

Politics 

Abdul Rahman contested Padang Tengku assembly state in 2004 and re-elected in 2008 general election. He contested Lipis parliamentary seat in 2013 and won that seat. He contested again in 2018 general election and retained the seat.

On 9 March 2020, Muhyiddin Yassin announced that Abdul Rahman will be appointed as Deputy Minister of Rural Development and to be served along with Henry Sum Agong from Gabungan Parti Sarawak.

Election results

Honours
  :
 Knight Companion of the Order of the Crown of Pahang (DIMP) – Dato' (2009)
  Grand Knight of the Order of Sultan Ahmad Shah of Pahang (SSAP) – Dato' Sri (2019)

References 

1964 births
Living people
People from Pahang
Malaysian people of Malay descent
Malaysian Muslims
United Malays National Organisation politicians
Members of the Dewan Rakyat
21st-century Malaysian politicians